USCGC Point Ellis (WPB-82330) was an  Point class cutter constructed at the Coast Guard Yard at Curtis Bay, Maryland in 1962 for use as a law enforcement and search and rescue patrol boat.

Construction and design details
Point Ellis was built to accommodate an 8-man crew. She was powered by two  VT600 Cummins diesel main drive engines and had two five-bladed  propellers. The main drive engines were later replaced by  VT800 Cummins engines. Engine exhaust was ported through the transom rather than through a conventional stack and this permitted a 360 degree view from the bridge; a feature that was very useful in search and rescue work as well as a combat environment.

The design specifications for Point Ellis included a steel hull for durability and an aluminum superstructure and longitudinally framed construction was used to save weight. Ease of operation with a small crew size was possible because of the non-manned main drive engine spaces. Controls and alarms located on the bridge allowed one man operation of the cutter thus eliminating a live engineer watch in the engine room. Because of design, four men could operate the cutter; however, the need for resting watchstanders brought the crew size to eight men for normal domestic service. The screws were designed for ease of replacement and could be changed without removing the cutter from the water. A clutch-in idle speed of three knots helped to conserve fuel on lengthy patrols and an eighteen knot maximum speed could get the cutter on scene quickly. Air-conditioned interior spaces were a part of the original design for the Point class cutter. Interior access to the deckhouse was through a watertight door on the starboard side aft of the deckhouse. The deckhouse contained the cabin for the officer-in-charge and the executive petty officer. The deckhouse also included a small arms locker, scuttlebutt, a small desk and head. Access to the lower deck and engine room was down a ladder. At the bottom of the ladder was the galley, mess and recreation deck. A watertight door at the front of the mess bulkhead led to the main crew quarters which was ten feet long and included six bunks that could be stowed, three bunks on each side. Forward of the bunks was the crew's head complete with a compact sink, shower and commode. Accommodations for a 13-man crew were installed for Vietnam service.

History
After delivery in 1962, Point Ellis was assigned a homeport of Port Townsend, Washington, where she served as a law enforcement and search and rescue patrol boat.

At the request of the United States Navy, in April 1965, she was alerted for service in South Vietnam and assigned to Coast Guard Squadron One in support of Operation Market Time along with 16 other Point class cutters. While the crew completed overseas training and weapons qualifications at Coast Guard Island and Camp Parks, California, Point Ellis was loaded onto a merchant ship, and transported to Subic Bay, Philippines in May 1965 where she was refitted for combat service. Shipyard modifications included installation of new single-sideband radio equipment, additional floodlights, small arms lockers, additional sound-powered phone circuits, and the addition of four M2 machine guns. The original bow mounted machine gun was replaced with a combination over-under .50 caliber machine gun/81mm trigger fired mortar that had been developed by the Coast Guard for service in Vietnam.
For service in Vietnam, two officers were added to the crew complement to add seniority to the crew in the mission of interdicting vessels at sea.

After almost two weeks at sea, they arrived at their new duty station on 20 July and began patrolling the coastal waters near Da Nang. Duty consisted of boarding Vietnamese junks to search for contraband weapons and ammunition and check the identification papers of persons on board. Permanent engineering and logistic support of Division 12 was provided by a U.S. Navy non-self-propelled floating workshop, YR-71. During this time, the WPB's were directed to paint the hulls and superstructures formula 20 deck gray to cover the stateside white paint. This increased the effectiveness of night patrols.

On 5 February 1966 Point Ellis attempted to board a junk and the five man crew beached the craft and fled the scene. A landing party from Point Ellis went after them and managed to capture one along with identification papers and belongings of the others. This type of landing party action was seen by the commander of Squadron One as too hazardous and orders were issued not to pursue fleeing Viet Cong (VC) suspects through the surf.

While on patrol on 8 December 1966, Point Ellis came across a non-motorized fishing boat with two very frightened men aboard that had been blown by tropical storms away from Hainan Island, part of the People's Republic of China. The Law of the Sea required their rescue and they were returned to their homeland through diplomatic channels.

On 14 March 1967, she detected an enemy steel-hulled trawler and forced it to beach. The VC crew was forced to scuttle the trawler and destroy its cargo of mortars, small arms, uniforms and other contraband.

On 9 December 1969, Point Ellis was turned over to the Republic of Vietnam Navy as part of the Vietnamization of the war effort and recommissioned as Lê Ngọc Thanh.

References

Bibliography

External links
 The Coast Guard's Vietnam Augusta State University website

Ellis
1962 ships
Vietnam War patrol vessels of the United States
United States Coast Guard ships transferred to the Republic of Vietnam Navy
Ships built by the United States Coast Guard Yard